Temnora camerounensis is a moth of the family Sphingidae. It is known from Cameroon, Gabon, the Central African Republic, the Democratic Republic of the Congo, Uganda and Nigeria.

It is similar to Temnora rattrayi rattrayi, but the markings on the forewing are more distinct. The forewing upperside has the subbasal and median bands only faintly indicated.

References

Temnora
Moths described in 1923
Insects of Cameroon
Insects of West Africa
Fauna of the Central African Republic
Fauna of Gabon
Moths of Africa